Another song with the same name, written by Graham Lyle and Benny Gallagher, was recorded by McGuinness Flint and Mary Hopkin in the early 1970s.

"Sparrow" is a 1978 jazz song recorded by singer Marvin Gaye issued on the singer's 1978 album, Here, My Dear album. The lyrics basically have a poetic and religious tone to them as Gaye calls a sparrow "to sing (his) beautiful song" to let him make sure that things are all right even when they aren't. In the song's climactic bridge, Gaye coos to the bird to sing to him personally before the bird flies away in hopes he can find inspiration.

Personnel
All vocals, keyboards and synthesizers by Marvin Gaye
Drums by Bugsy Wilcox
Percussion by Elmira Collins
Bass by Frank Blair
Guitar by Wali Ali
Trumpet by Nolan Smith
Tenor saxophone by Charles Owens and Fernando Harkness
Alto saxophone (solo) by Ernie Fields

Marvin Gaye songs
Songs written by Marvin Gaye
Songs about birds
Song recordings produced by Marvin Gaye
Songs written by Ed Townsend